Bikyan (Bikyän) is a rural locality (a village) in Verkhnegaleyevsky Selsoviet, Zilairsky District, Bashkortostan, Russia. The population was 29 as of 2010. There is 1 street.

Geography 
Bikyan is located 7 km east of Zilair (the district's administrative centre) by road.

References 

Rural localities in Zilairsky District